Validation may refer to:

 Data validation, in computer science, ensuring that data inserted into an application satisfies defined formats and other input criteria
 Forecast verification, validating and verifying prognostic output from a numerical model
 Regression validation, in statistics, determining whether the outputs of a regression model are adequate
 Social validation, compliance in a social activity to fit in and be part of the majority
 Statistical model validation, determining whether the outputs of a statistical model are acceptable
 Validation (drug manufacture), documenting that a process or system meets its predetermined specifications and quality attributes
 Validation (gang membership), a formal process for designating a criminal as a member of a gang
 Validation of foreign studies and degrees, processes for transferring educational credentials between countries
 Validation therapy, a therapy developed by Naomi Feil for older people with cognitive impairments and dementia
 Verification and validation (software), checking that software meets specifications and fulfills its intended purpose
 Verification and validation, in engineering, confirming that a product or service meets the needs of its users
 XML validation, the process of checking a document written in XML to confirm that it both is "well-formed" and follows a defined structure

See also 
 Cross validation (disambiguation)
 Revalidation, of medical doctors in UK
 Validity (disambiguation)
 Verification (disambiguation)